Clarence Mervin "Merv" Leitch (January 13, 1926 – June 30, 1990) was a former lawyer and provincial level politician from Alberta, Canada. He served as a member of the Legislative Assembly of Alberta from 1971 to 1982 sitting with the governing Progressive Conservative caucus. During his time in office he served numerous cabinet portfolios in the government of Peter Lougheed.

Early life
Leitch was an active and high profile lawyer. He served as President of the Calgary Bar Association and as a Partner in the Macleod Dixon Law Firm and on the Board of the Canadian Institute of Resources Law and was a director on several corporations.

He left his legal practice to pursue a political career.

Political career
Leitch ran for a seat to the Alberta Legislature in the 1971 Alberta general election. He won a hotly contested race in the new electoral district of Calgary-Egmont to pick up the seat for the Progressive Conservative party who would form government that election. He defeated Social Credit candidate Pat O'Byrne by over 1,000 votes to win the district.

After the election Premier Peter Lougheed appointed Leitch to the Executive Council of Alberta. He served as the Attorney General in the first Progressive Conservative government cabinet. At Premier Lougheed's request, he prepared the first piece of legislation for the Progressive Conservative government in 1972 Bill 1 the Alberta Bill of Rights, which was introduced by Premier Lougheed. He ran for his second term in office in the 1975 Alberta general election, this time with ministerial advantage. He was returned with a landslide winning over 10,000 votes while the opposition votes collapsed.

Premier Lougheed promoted Leitch to the Provincial Treasurer portfolio in 1975. He held that portfolio while running for his third term in office in the 1979 Alberta general election. He would drop a significant share of his popular vote but still win his district with a landslide. The opposition candidates failed to make any gains. Leitch was appointed to the Minister of Energy and Natural Resources portfolio and held that until he retired from provincial politics at dissolution of the legislature in 1982.

Late life
Leitch died at the end of June 1990. With the support and direction of former Premier Peter Lougheed and other friends, The University of Calgary created a lecture series, now the Merv Leitch Q.C. Memorial Visiting Chair, in his honor. Every year a new person is designated as a visiting chair in the University of Calgary Faculty of Law to give lectures in his honor; the lecture is also given at his alma mater, the University of Alberta.  These have been chiefly within the fields of natural resource and constitutional law. Annual scholarships for law students in their second and third years at each of the Universities of Calgary and Alberta is also awarded in his honor.

References

External links
Legislative Assembly of Alberta Members Listing

Progressive Conservative Association of Alberta MLAs
1990 deaths
University of Alberta alumni
1926 births
Members of the Executive Council of Alberta